Meerbrook is a small village in North Staffordshire, on the River Churnet at the edge of the Peak District National Park. It is situated four miles north of the town of Leek, in the parish of Leekfrith. The Roaches and Hen Cloud, popular walking and climbing locations, are very nearby.

History
The area grew with the expansion of the early medieval wool industry, and the Cistercian Abbey of Dieulacres held three sheep farms in the village. A chapel was built in 1537, later serving as a schoolroom with a paid schoolmaster until around the 1780s.  The present church of St. Matthew sits in the centre of the village, and was built 1870–1873.

The local Meerbrook coalfield was dug commercially from around the 1600s, until 1878.

Part of the village was submerged under the man-made Tittesworth reservoir in the early 1960s. There was a silk manufacturing mill, but this closed in 1970.  Meerbrook's village school closed in 1969, and the building is now a youth hostel.

Today
Situated between The Roaches and Tittesworth Reservoir, Meerbrook provides a base for a wide variety of outdoor leisure activities.  There is a pub, The Lazy Trout, and the Meerbrook Youth Hostel.  There is a large and modern Village Hall located just to the west of the village.  An annual Scarecrow Festival is held each May.  The Peak District Boundary Walk runs through the village.

See also
Listed buildings in Leekfrith

References 

Towns and villages of the Peak District
Staffordshire Moorlands